Melanius may refer to:

Saint Mellonius, 4th century bishop of Rotomagus 
Saint Melaine, 6th century bishop of Rennes
Saint Melanius I of Viviers, 5th century bishop of the Roman Catholic Diocese of Viviers
Saint Melanius II of Viviers, 6th century bishop of the Roman Catholic Diocese of Viviers